The Crowne Plaza Seattle-Downtown is a 34-story hotel in downtown Seattle, in the U.S. state of Washington.

Description and history 
The building was completed in 1980 and renovated in 2019. Close the Seattle Convention Center and generally geared towards business travelers, Crowne Plaza Seattle has 415 rooms and suites. The pet-friendly hotel has a gym and the restaurant Regatta Bar & Grille.

Crowne Plaza Seattle is affiliated with IHG Hotels & Resorts and has been ranked number 48 in U.S. News & World Report's list of the best Seattle hotels. Lonely Planet says, "This 34-floor downtown skyscraper is more business-like than ostentatious, although a 2014 renovation has upped its ante somewhat. Get a room on one of the higher floors and enjoy broad Seattle vistas while swanning around in your bathrobe using the free wi-fi."

References

External links 
 
 Crowne Plaza Seattle-Downtown at IHG

Downtown Seattle
Hotels in Seattle